North Bend High School is a public high school in North Bend, Oregon, United States.

History
The North Bend school district awarded its first four-year diplomas in the spring of 1908, the first high school in Coos County, Oregon, to do so. The school was operating out of the Central School building at that time. Even prior to that, in the fall of 1907, the school colors of brown and gold were chosen for the school. The superintendent at the time, A.G. Rabb, had graduated from Baldwin College in Ohio, which had those same colors.  Raab also instituted a tradition of annually tying a ribbon with the name of each year's graduates to a shovel used to plant a sprig of ivy or a tree to beautify the schools campus.

By the 1909-1910 school year a new building, Kinney High, was built to provide a place of higher education in North Bend, Oregon. Only one student graduated from Kinney High in 1910.  A year later the school was renamed North Bend High School when it was discovered that the man who donated the property for the school, Lorenzo D. Kinney, did not have clear title to the land.

In 1928, the high school's letterman club (Order of North Bend) suggested a Bulldog mascot for the school. It was first mentioned in the local newspapers in the fall. It remains the school's mascot.

A history book about North Bend High School was published in 2016. Extracurricular: A History of Athletics and Activities at North Bend (OR) High School by Steven Greif, has 455 pages of content, hundreds of photographs, and an index. Copies of the book are available through the NBHS athletic office. Proceeds from sales go directly to the North Bend School Foundation. The North Bend School Foundation was established in 2007. The purpose of the NBSF is to enhance and augment the North Bend School District’s curricular and co-curricular programs by conducting fundraising campaigns and pursuing donations. Monetary awards are awarded on a regular basis to staff members who submit innovative grant requests for student programs and activities for which federal, state, district and local funding is inadequate. Together donors and the Foundation can leave a legacy that will benefit future generations and make a bold statement to the students in our district that the community supports them. The Foundation is a 501(c)(3) and donations are tax deductible. The NBSF website is at: www.nbschoolfoundation.org.

In October 2020, a number of students were placed into quarantine following coronavirus cases being reported at the school.

Academics
In 1987, North Bend High School was honored in the Blue Ribbon Schools Program, the highest honor a school can receive in the United States.

In 2008, 78% of the school's seniors received their high school diploma. Of 198 students, 154 graduated, 28 dropped out, 3 received a modified diploma, and 13 are still in high school.

Sports
The first athletic team to win any sort of championship was the girls' basketball team of 1908-1909 which won the Coos County League title that winter.

State championships
 Wrestling: 1979
 Women's basketball: 2005
 Men's cross country: 2006, 2007
 Women's swimming: 2007, 2013, 2015, 2018
 Men's swimming: 2011
 Forensics: 2013, 2014
 Symphonic band: 2014, 2015, 2016, 2017
 Volleyball: 2006
 Football: 2016
 Men's Track and Field: 2014, 2019
 Oregonian Cup: 2013, 2017

Notable alumni
Sheila Bleck - professional bodybuilder
Bill Borcher - University of Oregon Basketball Coach
John Hunter - NFL player

References

Educational institutions established in 1908
High schools in Coos County, Oregon
Public high schools in Oregon
1908 establishments in Oregon
North Bend, Oregon